Kim So-Hee (Hangul: 김소희, Hanja: 金昭希) (born September 16, 1976 in Daegu) is a retired female South Korean short track speed skater who competed in the 1992 Winter Olympics and in the 1994 Winter Olympics. She won one Gold medal and one Bronze medal from the Olympics. She is the 1992 Overall World Champion for Short-track speed skating, and is the first Woman from South Korea to have become one.

In 1992 she finished ninth in the 500 m competition.

Two years later she was a member of the Korean relay team which won the gold medal in the 3000 m relay event. In the 1000 m discipline she won the bronze medal and in the 500 m competition she finished fifth.

Kim retired soon after 1997 Winter Universiade, where she won Gold medal for 1000m Short-track speed skating.

External links
 

1976 births
Living people
South Korean female short track speed skaters
Olympic short track speed skaters of South Korea
Olympic gold medalists for South Korea
Olympic bronze medalists for South Korea
Olympic medalists in short track speed skating
Short track speed skaters at the 1992 Winter Olympics
Short track speed skaters at the 1994 Winter Olympics
Medalists at the 1994 Winter Olympics
Asian Games medalists in short track speed skating
Short track speed skaters at the 1990 Asian Winter Games
Short track speed skaters at the 1996 Asian Winter Games
Sportspeople from Daegu

Medalists at the 1990 Asian Winter Games
Medalists at the 1996 Asian Winter Games
Asian Games gold medalists for South Korea
Asian Games silver medalists for South Korea
Universiade medalists in short track speed skating
Universiade gold medalists for South Korea
Universiade bronze medalists for South Korea
Competitors at the 1995 Winter Universiade
Competitors at the 1997 Winter Universiade
21st-century South Korean women